Janice Suber McNair (born September 30, 1936) is the co-founder and current owner of the Houston Texans, a position which she assumed after the death of her husband Bob McNair in 2018.

Early life
Janice McNair was born on September 30, 1936 and was raised in Myrtle Beach, South Carolina and attended Columbia College, a private women's liberal arts college. It was in her college years in which she met her future husband Bob.

Career
McNair was the right-hand to her husband throughout much of his career, including when he founded Cogen Technologies, which was sold in 1999 to Enron and CalPERS. She co-founded the Texans in 1999 alongside her husband.

Following her husband's death in 2018, McNair became the team's principal owner, with the title of "senior chair". Her son Cal is the current CEO and day-to-day head of the franchise. However, Janice represents the Texans at NFL owners meetings and other league functions.

McNair is one of ten female NFL team owners or co-owners. The others are Virginia Halas McCaskey (Chicago Bears), Kim Pegula (Buffalo Bills), Carol Davis (Las Vegas Raiders), Dee Haslam (Cleveland Browns), Amy Adams Strunk (Tennessee Titans), Gayle Benson (New Orleans Saints), Sheila Ford Hamp (Detroit Lions), Denise DeBartolo York (San Francisco 49ers) and Jody Allen (Seattle Seahawks).

McNair's reported net worth is believed to be at $4 billion USD. She is also currently the richest female sports owner in the United States.

Philanthropy
In 1989, Janice McNair and her husband established the Robert and Janice McNair Educational Foundation. The goal of the foundation was to remove some of the financial barriers that were preventing Rutherford County High school graduates from attending college. The first beneficiaries were the class of 1990. To date, the McNair foundation has awarded approximately $2.6 million in financial aid.

In August 2019, McNair donated $5 million to Pro Vision Inc, a community building project in the Sunnyside neighborhood of Houston. It was reported to be the largest donation ever made by an NFL owner.

During the COVID-19 pandemic in Houston, McNair donated $1 million to the Houston Rent Relief fund to help apartment residents in Houston facing eviction during the pandemic economic recession.

References

 
 

1936 births
American billionaires
Houston Texans executives
Businesspeople from Houston
Women sports owners
Living people
Columbia College (South Carolina) alumni
Houston Texans owners